Türk Ocağı Limasol Spor Kulübü is a Turkish Cypriot sports club founded in Limassol, although it moved to Kyrenia after the division of the island in 1974. It was established in 1952.

Colors
The club colours are yellow and black.

Former notable players
Ekrem İmamoğlu (Mayor of Istanbul)

Stadium

Honors
Kıbrıs Kupası and Federasyon Kupası: (5)
 1982, 1984, 1990, 2007, 2017

Cumhurbaşkanlığı Kupası: (3)
 1982, 1984, 1990

References

Association football clubs established in 1953
Football clubs in Northern Cyprus